Adamstown may refer to:

Locations

Australia
 Adamstown, New South Wales, a suburb in New South Wales

Ireland
 Adamstown, Castletownkindalen, a townland in Castletownkindalen civil parish, barony of Moycashel, County Westmeath
 Adamstown, Conry, a townland in Conry civil parish, barony of Rathconrath, County Westmeath
 Adamstown, a townland in County Louth
 Adamstown, a townland in County Meath
 Adamstown, County Wexford, a village in County Wexford
 Adamstown, Dublin, a suburb of Dublin

Pitcairn Island
 Adamstown, Pitcairn Islands, the capital city of the Pitcairn Islands

United States
 Adamstown, alternate name for Neals Diggins, California
 Adamstown, Maryland, a town in Frederick County, Maryland
 Adamstown, Pennsylvania, a borough in Lancaster County, Pennsylvania

Transportation
Adamstown railway station, New South Wales, in Adamstown, New South Wales, Australia
Adamstown railway station (Ireland), in Adamstown, Dublin, Ireland

See also
 Adamston (disambiguation)